Barrington, officially named the Municipality of the District of Barrington, is a district municipality in western Shelburne County, Nova Scotia, Canada. Statistics Canada classifies the district municipality as a municipal district.

Geography
The Municipality of the District of Barrington forms the southernmost part of the province and contains Cape Sable, the eastern boundary between the North Atlantic Ocean and the Gulf of Maine.

Cape Sable Island is home to the tallest lighthouse in the Maritime Provinces. The Cape Light stands 101 feet tall, located on Canada's most southern saltwater beach, The Hawk Beach.

History
The Mi'kmaq called the area, "Ministiguish" or "Ministegkek", meaning "he has gone for it." The Acadians called the area, "La Passage." The area was settled in 1760 by eighty families from Cape Cod and Nantucket, Massachusetts. Barrington is named after William Barrington, 2nd Viscount Barrington.

Demographics

Communities

Access routes
Highways and numbered routes that run through the district municipality, including external routes that start or finish at the municipal boundary:

Highways

Trunk Routes

Collector Routes:

External Routes:
None

See also
 List of municipalities in Nova Scotia

References

External links

Communities in Shelburne County, Nova Scotia
Barrington
1879 establishments in Canada